Cleopa Kilonzo Mailu (born c. 1956) is a Kenyan politician. He served as the Kenyan Minister of Health.

Early life
Cleopa Kilonzo Mailu was born circa 1956. He attended schools in Kyulu and Kangundo until he went to Friends School Kamusinga. He graduated from the University of Nairobi and earned a master's degree in medical genetics from the University of Glasgow.

Career
Mailu started his career as an intern at the  Kenyatta National Hospital.

Mailu was the founding director of its department of medical genetics in 1989.

From 1995 to 2000, he worked for the Ministry of Health and led an anti-polio campaign.

Mailu subsequently worked for Unicef and the World Health Organization in Malawi and Zambia.

Mailu became the first African CEO of The Nairobi Hospital in 2003.

On 2 August 2018, Mailu presented his credentials to the Director-General of the United Nations Office at Geneva (UNOG) as the new Permanent Representative of Kenya to the UNOG.

Mailu is Chairing the Meeting of State Parties (22-25 November 2021) of the Biological Weapons Convention in Geneva.

Personal life
Mailu has a wife, Teresa, and two sons.

References

Living people
1950s births
University of Nairobi alumni
Alumni of the University of Glasgow
Alumni of Friends School Kamusinga
Kenyan politicians
Kenyan diplomats
Ambassadors of Kenya
 
Year of birth uncertain